Marina Square is a shopping mall in Singapore which opened in the late 1980s. It is part of the first building complex built on the reclaimed land at Marina Centre, and was the largest shopping mall in the country at the time. The complex also houses three hotels, which are the Mandarin Oriental, Parkroyal Collection Marina Bay and The Pan Pacific Singapore.

History
Marina Square was built in 1985 on the then newly reclaimed Marina Centre, as the first major mixed-use complex in the area, along with Marina Mandarin, Mandarin Oriental and The Pan Pacific hotels. It was the largest shopping mall in Singapore with 59,000 square metres of retail space when it opened in 1986, to improve accessibility, more bus services were introduced to Marina Centre. During the late 1980s and 1990s, it featured anchor tenants Tokyu department store and Metro department store, as well as an open air food court, a Magic Land arcade and a twin Eng Wah Cinema which was closed in 1993.

The Tokyu store was replaced by American retailer Kmart, which was then replaced by MegaMart. NTUC Fairprice later took over the space occupied by MegaMart, and Giant hypermart later took over the same premises.

In September 1996, an entertainment complex, Marina Leisureplex, opened at the eastern end of the mall, comprising a six-screen Golden Village cineplex, a Superbowl arcade and bowling alley.

In early 2004, the mall started its first major upgrading works which were completed in mid-2006. The outdoor food court was converted into an air-conditioned one, and the mall layout reconfigured and remodeled. This also increased the retail space area to 65,000 sq m. A new retail concept was introduced, such as several furniture shops on the 3rd floor. More lifts and escalators were added to enhance accessibility as well.

The mall has completed its second renovation exercise, thus expanding its floor area to 100,000 sq m and a refreshed tenant mix. Phase 1 introduced a wing dedicated to food and beverage establishments, called the Dining Edition, including some F&B establishments new to Singapore. Renovation began in January 2012 and completed in September 2013. Phase 2 consisted of an extended retail zone and a new retail wing facing Marina Bay. It introduced tenants such as Emporium Shokuhin, a Japanese market and Pororo Park, a theme park dedicated to children. It was completed in November 2015.

Phase 3 of the renovation works consisted of the mall's east wing, which prompted the closure of the Marina Leisureplex (GV Marina Square) and John Little department store. Both tenants vacated the mall in 2014 and have been replaced by PSB Academy's mega city campus. PSB Academy has opened in phases at the end of 2016. In August 2016, a cluster of IT stores displaced by the closure of Funan Digitalife Mall opened, taking up the entirety of level 3 of the East Wing. They include exclusive stores of major computer and laptop brands such as HP, Dell, Acer, Asus and Lenovo, all provided by homegrown retailer Newstead, which closed down in 2019 when after the company had filed for bankruptcy. In September 2018, Emporium Shokuhin has been closed down, and a 18,000 square feet indoor playground, Kiztopia, took over the space and opened on 15 June 2019.

Transport Connections

Bus Services
Buses are accessible through Raffles Avenue (Esplanade Theatre and The Float @ Marina Bay), Raffles Boulevard (Pan Pacific Singapore), Esplanade Drive (near One Raffles Link), and Temasek Boulevard (Suntec Convention Centre). City Sightseeing Singapore used to run along Raffles Avenue until 2010 where it was replaced by route T8 (The Original Tour), then renumbered to T1. Previously, the bus stop at Esplanade was formerly called opposite Marina Square from 1985 to 2003, and was renamed to The Esplanade in 2003. It is also a terminus for Gray Line Worldwide bus services. The bus stop pole was upgraded in various phases, which is in 1996 (to 4 columns) and 2007 (to 5 columns).

Rail
The mall is linked to City Hall via CityLink Mall and One Raffles Link, Esplanade via the Marina Link, and to Promenade via Millenia Walk and Pan Pacific Hotel link bridge.

See also
 List of shopping malls in Singapore

References

Shopping malls in Singapore
Downtown Core (Singapore)
Marina Centre
John C. Portman Jr. buildings
1985 establishments in Singapore